The Monte Rosa SkyMarathon is an international skyrunning competition held in Alagna Valsesia on Monte Rosa (Italy) which marked the origins of skyrunning.

History
The first edition of the race was in 1992 to and from Alagna, reaching Colle del Lys at 4,250m where the race was turned around due to strong winds. In 1993 and 1994, and from 2018, the race course was from Alagna, 1,192m to the summit of Monte Rosa, 4,554m and back, making it Europe's highest race. (In 1996 the highest point reached was the Gnifetti Hut, 3,647m).

Between 2002 to 2011 the race (also known as Trofeo Stefano Degasparis) took place on a different course to and from Alagna to the Passo dei Salati at 2,980m.

In 2009 the race was valid for the Skyrunner World Series.

When the original course was relaunched in 2018 (the 25th anniversary of the first race to the summit), a new rule was introduced where participants race in teams of two for safety.

The winners of the 2019 edition were Italian William Boffelli with Austrian Jakob Herrmann (men) (4h51'58") and Natalia Tomasiak with Katarzyna Solinska (women) from Poland (6h38'14").

The record holders for the original course (Alagna - Monte Rosa - Alagna) are Italians Fabio Meraldi in 4h24' and Gisella Bendotti in 5h34', both set in 1994. Emelie Forsberg finished in a faster time of 5h03'56" in 2018. She teamed with Kilian Jornet in a mixed gender team which falls into the male category, Bendotti's individual time still stands. Forsberg's time is the best female performance over the course.

Editions

Legend: *reduced course due to bad weather

Trofeo Stefano Degasparis
From 2002 to 2011 the race took place on a different course from Alagna to the Passo dei Salati at 2,980m and back.

Legend: *28 km course; **reduced course due to snow

References

External links 
 https://www.monterosaskymarathon.com/?lang=en

Skyrunning competitions
Skyrunner World Series
Defunct sports competitions in Italy
Recurring sporting events established in 1992
1993 establishments in Italy
Alagna Valsesia
Sport in Piedmont
Athletics competitions in Italy